Eemshaven railway station is a train station on the Sauwerd–Roodeschool railway, located in the Eemshaven harbour in the province of Groningen, Netherlands. It is the northernmost train station in the country.

The station was opened on 28 March 2018 although an official inauguration by King Willem-Alexander of the Netherlands took place on 20 June 2018. The station is mainly used by ferry passengers to the German island of Borkum. Train services are very limited, to only a few trains a day, connecting to this ferry service. The existing bus connection to the city of Groningen was cancelled in favour of the train connection. Additionally, some harbour workers may use the train service, although its use for commuting is not very attractive due to the remote location of the station and the very limited service (no trains during rush hours).

The 4,7 kilometers long railway line to Eemshaven has existed since 1978 but has only been in use for cargo trains. This existing part was made suitable for passenger traffic with another 3 kilometres of tracks newly built in order to reach the ferry terminal.

While it was initially planned that trains would only call at Eemshaven at ferry times, carrier Arriva has announced to proceed to the station every half hour instead. The other trains end at Roodeschool.

References

External links
 Public transport planner
 Arriva website

Railway stations in Groningen (province)
Railway stations opened in 2018
Transport in Het Hogeland